Chat Noir means "Black Cat" in French. It refers to:
 Adrien Agreste, a character in Miraculous: Tales of Ladybug & Cat Noir
 Le Chat Noir, a 19th-century cabaret in Paris, France, or its weekly magazine
This was also the name of a nightclub in Nancy, France, where a shooting occurred in May 2022.
 Chat Noir (French for "Black Cat") is a cabaret and revue theatre in Oslo, Norway.

See also
 Black cat (disambiguation)
 Henri, le Chat Noir, a web series by William Braden
 Le Pas du Chat Noir, a 2001 jazz album by Anouar Brahem